James William Plunkett (born December 5, 1947) is an American former professional football player who was a quarterback in the National Football League (NFL) for sixteen seasons. He achieved his greatest professional success during his final eight seasons with the Raiders franchise, whom he led to two Super Bowl titles.

A Heisman Trophy winner and future College Football Hall of Fame inductee at Stanford, Plunkett was selected first overall by the New England Patriots in the 1971 NFL Draft. His tenure with the Patriots was productive, but after an injury-shortened 1975 season he was traded to the San Francisco 49ers, where he played in 1976 and 1977. Released from the 49ers after suffering further injuries, Plunkett signed with the Oakland Raiders for 1978.

Initially serving as a backup for the Raiders, Plunkett became the starting quarterback during the 1980 season and led them to win Super Bowl XV, where he was named MVP. In 1983, Plunkett again ascended from backup to starter to quarterback the relocated Los Angeles Raiders to victory in Super Bowl XVIII. He is the only eligible quarterback with two Super Bowl wins as a starter not to be inducted into the Pro Football Hall of Fame.

Early life
Plunkett was born to Mexican-American parents with an Irish-German grandfather on his paternal side. Plunkett's father was a news vendor afflicted with progressive blindness, who had to support his blind wife along with their three children. Plunkett's parents were both born in New Mexico, both Mexican Americans; his mother, whose maiden name was Carmen Blea, was born in Santa Fe and his father, William Gutierrez Plunkett, was born in Albuquerque. Carmen was also of Native American ancestry. His father William died of a heart attack in 1969.

The Plunketts moved to California during World War II. William Plunkett first worked in the Richmond shipyards. By this time, Jim's two older sisters, Genevieve (16 years older than Jim) and Mary Ann (5 years older than Jim) had been born; Jim was born in 1947, after the family had moved to Santa Clara. They later moved to San Jose where William ran a newsstand, and where they were able to find low-cost housing. The family lived in relative poverty, and received state financial aid. Jim and his sisters learned to work hard and do things for themselves as they grew up. They also helped Carmen with cooking and other household chores.

When Jim was growing up, the family's financial situation was a big problem for him. He did not like the area he lived in, often did not have money for dates, and avoided bringing friends to his house. He worked from an early age, cleaning up at a gas station while in elementary school, delivering newspapers, bagging groceries, and working in orchards. In his high school years, he worked during the summer.

Jim went to William C. Overfelt High School in the 9th and 10th grades and then transferred to and graduated from James Lick High School, both located in east San Jose, California. Plunkett showed his talent for tossing the football by winning a throwing contest at the age of 14 with a heave of over 60 yards. Once he arrived at the school, he played quarterback and defensive end for the football team. He competed in basketball, baseball, track and wrestling - earning a California High School Individual Wrestling Championship. Plunkett is on the Hall of Fame wall at James Lick.

College career
Upon entering Stanford University, Plunkett endured a rough freshman campaign after being weakened by a thyroid operation. His performance originally caused head coach John Ralston to switch him to defensive end, but Plunkett was adamant in remaining at quarterback, throwing 500 to 1,000 passes every day to polish his arm. He earned the opportunity to start in 1968, and in his first game, completed ten of thirteen passes for 277 yards and four touchdowns, and never relinquished his hold on the starting spot. Plunkett's arrival ushered in an era of wide-open passing, pro-style offenses in the Pac-8, a trend that has continued to the present.

His successful junior campaign saw him set league records for touchdown passes (20), passing yards (2,673) and total offense (2,786). This display of offensive firepower led Washington State coach Jim Sweeney to call Plunkett "The best college football player I've ever seen." In his senior year, 1970, he led Stanford to a conference championship and their first Rose Bowl appearance since 1952, a game that ended with a 27–17 Stanford victory over the heavily favored Ohio State Buckeyes.

With eighteen passing and three rushing touchdowns added to his 2,715 passing yards on the year (which broke his own conference record), Plunkett was awarded the 1970 Heisman Trophy. Plunkett beat Notre Dame's Joe Theismann and Archie Manning of Ole Miss to win the award. He was the first Latino to win the Heisman Trophy. Aside from the Heisman, he captured the Maxwell Award for the nation's best player and was named player of the year by United Press International, The Sporting News, and SPORT magazine. In addition, the American College Football Coaches Association designated him as their Offensive Player of the Year. He became the second multiple recipient of the W.J. Voit Memorial Trophy, awarded each year to the outstanding football player on the Pacific Coast. Plunkett received the Voit Trophy in both 1969 and 1970. While at Stanford he joined Delta Tau Delta International Fraternity.

NFL career

UCLA coach Tommy Prothro had called Plunkett the "best pro quarterback prospect I've ever seen", echoing Sweeney's words from the year prior. His excellent arm strength and precision made him attractive to pro teams that relied much more heavily on the passing game than most college teams of the late 1960s. In 1971, he was drafted with the first overall pick in the NFL draft by the New England Patriots (the team was still known as the Boston Patriots at the time of the draft; the name change to New England did not become official until March 21 of that year). Plunkett was the first player of Hispanic heritage to be drafted with the first overall pick in the NFL draft. The Patriots finished the season at 6–8 for fourth place in the AFC East. Plunkett's first game was a 20–6 victory over the Oakland Raiders, the Patriots' first regular-season contest at Schaefer Stadium. New England also influenced the AFC East championship race, as Plunkett's 88-yard fourth-quarter touchdown pass to former Stanford teammate Randy Vataha on the final day of the season dropped the Baltimore Colts to a 10–4–0 record and into second place in the division behind the 10–3–1 Miami Dolphins. Two weeks before the Patriots defeated the Colts, Plunkett engineered a 34–13 victory over the Dolphins.

Continuing to be effective, Plunkett finished second in the NFL in passing yards in 1973, and in 1974 led the Patriots to an impressive 6-1 start, and the team's first non losing season in eight years, finishing second in the NFL in team scoring with 348 points, seven behind league leader Oakland. But Plunkett suffered a left shoulder separation early in the 1975 season, giving rookie Steve Grogan, who would become a fixture with the club for 16 seasons, extensive experience, and under the leadership of coach Chuck Fairbanks, New England's offense became more run-oriented, led by Sam Cunningham.

Prior to the 1976 NFL Draft, Plunkett was traded to the San Francisco 49ers in exchange for quarterback Tom Owen, two first-round picks in 1976, and a first and second-round pick in 1977. Plunkett led the 49ers to a 6–1 start before faltering to an 8–6 record. After a 5–9 season in 1977, the 49ers released him during the 1978 preseason.

Plunkett then joined the Oakland Raiders in 1978, serving in a reserve capacity over the next two years, throwing no passes in 1978 and just fifteen in 1979. However, five weeks into the 1980 season, his career took a major turn when starting QB Dan Pastorini fractured his leg in a game against the Kansas City Chiefs. The 32-year-old Plunkett came off the bench to relieve Pastorini, throwing five interceptions in a 31–17 loss. The Raiders, however, believing that Marc Wilson did not have the experience they wanted, called on Plunkett to start for the remainder of the year. In his first game as a starter, he completed eleven of fourteen passes with a touchdown and no interceptions. Plunkett guided Oakland to nine victories in eleven games and a playoff berth as a wild card. Plunkett led the Raiders to four playoff victories, including the first-ever victory by a wild card team in the Super Bowl, defeating the Philadelphia Eagles 27–10 in Super Bowl XV. Throwing for 261 yards and three touchdowns, Plunkett was named the game's MVP; subsequently, Plunkett has the distinction of being the first minority to quarterback a team to a Super Bowl victory and the only Latino to be named Super Bowl MVP. In addition to this, he became the second of four players to win the Heisman Trophy and Super Bowl MVP, alongside Roger Staubach, Marcus Allen, and Desmond Howard.

Later in his career, the Raiders moved to Los Angeles. After returning to the backup role in 1983, Plunkett again assumed starting duties, this time after an injury to Marc Wilson. The Raiders advanced to Super Bowl XVIII, where they defeated the Washington Redskins, 38–9. Plunkett completed 16 of 25 passes for 172 yards and a touchdown in the game.

Plunkett spent most of the 1984–1986 seasons either injured or as a backup, and missed the entire 1987 season following rotator cuff surgery. He retired during the 1988 pre-season as the fourth-leading passer in Raiders history. He holds the Raider record, and is tied for the league record, for the longest career pass, which occurred during a 99-yard pass play against the Washington Redskins on October 2, 1983. He retired as the only NFL quarterback to win two Super Bowls with the same franchise in different cities, winning his first while the Raiders were in Oakland and his second while they were in Los Angeles.

Hall of Fame debate
Plunkett is the subject of annual debate about whether he belongs in the Pro Football Hall of Fame. Arguments for induction focus on his two Super Bowl victories and Super Bowl MVP award, along with the personal challenges he overcame in the NFL. The arguments against his induction center on Plunkett having only three winning seasons, unimpressive career statistics, and no Pro Bowl or All-Pro selections. Similar debates occurred in relation to Ken Stabler, another Super Bowl-winning quarterback with the Raiders, who missed being elected into the Hall for 25 years before being elected posthumously in 2016. 

Plunkett was inducted into the College Football Hall of Fame in 1990, the Bay Area Sports Hall of Fame in 1992 in San Francisco, California, and finally the California Sports Hall of Fame in 2007 in recognition for both his college and pro football careers. Plunkett received the Golden Plate Award of the American Academy of Achievement presented by Awards Council member Roger Staubach in 1981.

Later years
Interviewed in 2017, Plunkett told of being in "constant pain" and discussed the effects of at least ten career concussions. Plunkett reflected that his life "sucks" as a result of his physical injuries.

See also
 Bay Area Sports Hall of Fame
 California Sports Hall of Fame
 List of NCAA major college football yearly passing leaders
 List of NCAA major college football yearly total offense leaders

References

Bibliography

External links
 
 
 

1947 births
Living people
All-American college football players
American football quarterbacks
American people of German descent
American people of Irish descent
American sportspeople of Mexican descent
College Football Hall of Fame inductees
Heisman Trophy winners
Los Angeles Raiders players
Maxwell Award winners
New England Patriots players
Oakland Raiders players
Players of American football from San Jose, California
San Francisco 49ers players
Stanford Cardinal football players
Super Bowl MVPs